Share is a 2019 coming-of-age drama film, written and directed by Pippa Bianco, based upon Bianco's short film of the same name. It stars Rhianne Barreto, Charlie Plummer, Poorna Jagannathan, J. C. Mackenzie, Nicholas Galitzine, and Lovie Simone.

It had its world premiere at the Sundance Film Festival on January 25, 2019. It was released on July 27, 2019, by HBO Films.

Plot
Mandy, a 16-year old girl, receives text messages from her friends about a video that has gone viral. In the video, she is obviously unconscious. Her pants have been pulled down and she is surrounded by a group of chuckling boys. She remembers none of this. As she seeks to find out what happened, she is ostracized.

Cast
 Rhianne Barreto as Mandy Lundy
 Charlie Plummer as Dylan
 Poorna Jagannathan as Kerri Lundy
 J. C. Mackenzie as Mickey Lundy
 Lovie Simone as Jenna
 Nicholas Galitzine as A.J.
 Danny Mastrogiorgio as Tony
 Jhaleil Swaby as Mason
 Milcania Diaz-Rojas as Mia
 Christian Corrao as Tyler Lundy
 Emily Woloszuk as Kaylee
 Sydney Holmes as Lacey
 Emily Debowski as Pretty Girl
 Ivan Wanis Ruiz as Officer Gregg
 Darlene Cooke as Principal Marsh
 Alison Smiley as teacher
 Jai Jai Jones as Coach Chauncey 
 Kimmy Choi as reporter
 Anthony Q. Farrell as psychologist
 Ayesha Mansur Gonsalves as lawyer

Production
In May 2015, it was announced that Pippa Bianco was adapting her short Share (winner, Cinéfondation section, Cannes 2015) into a feature-length screenplay. In January 2016, the Sundance Institute picked up the film for their Screenwriters Lab. In March 2017, it was announced A24 would distribute the film, with newcomer Rhianne Barreto cast in the lead role. In October 2017, Charlie Plummer, Poorna Jagannathan, J. C. Mackenzie, Lovie Simone and Nicholas Galitzine had been cast in the film, with Carly Hugo, Tyler Byrne and Matthew Parker serving as producers.

Principal photography began in October 2017, in Toronto, Canada.

The music score was done by electronic musician Shlohmo, his first work in film scoring.

The film received The ReFrame Stamp for Gender-Balanced Production.

Release
The film had its world premiere at the Sundance Film Festival on January 25, 2019. Shortly after, HBO Films acquired distribution rights to the film. It was released on July 27, 2019.

Critical reception
Share received positive reviews from film critics. The website's critics consensus reads: "Grim yet compelling, Share avoids rote didacticism thanks to sensitive direction and committed central performances." On Metacritic, the film holds a rating of 73 out of 100, based on reviews from 8 critics, indicating "generally favorable reviews".

See also
 Post-assault treatment of sexual assault victims

References

External links
 
 
 

2019 films
2019 directorial debut films
2019 drama films
2010s high school films
2010s mystery films
2010s teen drama films
American high school films
American mystery films
American teen drama films
A24 (company) films
Features based on short films
Films about rape
Films shot in Toronto
HBO Films films
Sundance Film Festival award winners
2019 independent films
American coming-of-age drama films
2010s coming-of-age drama films
American drama television films
2010s English-language films
2010s American films